Stéphane Persol (born 24 March 1968) is a French former professional footballer who played as a defender.

Club career 
Persol made his debut for Paris Saint-Germain in a 3–0 Coupe de France loss against Sochaux on 5 April 1988. He played for the PSG reserve team for the following two seasons in the Division 3. On 17 May 1991, Persol played his second and final match for PSG, a 1–1 league draw against Brest.

International career 
Persol was a youth international for France.

After football 
Later in his life, Persol became the regional director of an environmental company in Plaisance-du-Touch.

References 

1968 births
Living people
French footballers
Association football defenders
FC Morangis-Chilly players
Paris Saint-Germain F.C. players
AS Corbeil-Essonnes (football) players
France youth international footballers
Ligue 1 players
French Division 3 (1971–1993) players